Melicope affinis is a species of shrub or tree in the family Rutaceae and is endemic to Queensland. It has trifoliate leaves and small greenish white flowers borne in panicles in leaf axils.

Description
Melicope affinis is a tree that typically grows to a height of  but also forms flowers and fruit as a shrub. The flowers are bisexual and arranged in panicles  or long in leaf axils.

Taxonomy
Melicope affinis was first formally described in 2001 by Thomas Gordon Hartley in the journal Allertonia from specimens collected by Bruce Gray in 1979.

Distribution and habitat

Conservation status
This species is classified as of "least concern" under the Queensland Government Nature Conservation Act 1992.

References

affinis
Sapindales of Australia
Flora of Queensland
Plants described in 2001
Taxa named by Thomas Gordon Hartley